The Khusraw mosque Arabized as Khusruwiyah Mosque was a mosque complex in Aleppo, Syria. It was located southeast of the Citadel. The mosque was commissioned by  
Husrev Pasa while he was governor of Aleppo under Sultan Suleiman I.

The mosque was completely destroyed during the Battle of Aleppo in summer 2014 by the Syrian Civil War.

Architecture

The complex consisted of a mosque, a madrasa, rooms for travellers, a public kitchen, shops and other facilities. The Khusruwiyah complex was designed by the renowned court architect Mimar Sinan.

See also
 Khosrow (word)

References

Religious buildings and structures completed in 1547
Ottoman mosques in Syria
Ottoman architecture in Aleppo
Mosques in Aleppo
Mausoleums in Syria
Madrasas in Aleppo
16th-century mosques
1547 establishments in the Ottoman Empire